Frayne or Frayn may refer to:

People
Bruce Frayne (1958), Australian sprinter
Trent Frayne (1918–2012), Canadian sportswriter
 Henry Frayne (musician) (born 1965), Irish-American musician
 Henry Frayne (athlete) (born 1990), Australian track and field athlete
David Frayne, a British Anglican priest, Provost of Blackburn
Alex Frayne, an Australian film director
John G. Frayne (1894–1990) physicist and sound engineer
Steve Frayne (1982) is an English magician who performs under the stage-name of Dynamo.
Shawn Frayne inventor of the Windbelt device for converting wind power to electricity
George Frayne leader of Commander Cody and His Lost Planet Airmen
Hilary Weston née Frayne (1942), Lieutenant Governor of Ontario
Michael Frayn (1933), an English playwright and novelist 
Rebecca Frayn (1962), an English documentary film maker, screenwriter and novelist.

Places
Frayne College, a co-educational school located in Baranduda, Victoria.
Ursula Frayne Catholic College, a private, co-educational school located southwest of Perth, Western Australia.

Other
Re: Fraynes (later The Fraynes) is a Canadian sports talk show television series.

Re: Fraynes Frayne is also a Gaelic word meaning Ash Tree.

See also
Defreine. Frayne is an anglicised version of Defreine.
Frain (disambiguation)
Frane (disambiguation)